Brockway is an unincorporated community and census-designated place (CDP) in southern McCone County, Montana, United States, located near the Redwater River. At the 2000 census, the Brockway area had a population of approximately 140 people.

Brockway is located near the junction of Montana Highway 200 and Montana Secondary Highway 253 along the Big Sky Back Country Byway, approximately 10 miles southwest of Circle, Montana.

Brockway is home to the annual Brockway Dairy Day Rodeo.

Demographics

History 
Brockway is named for three homesteader brothers. The post office was opened in 1913. Northern Pacific Railway’s Redwater branch line reached the town in 1928.

The town "became a major livestock shipping point reaching number one in the U.S. in 1934," according to historical marker author Bob Fletcher.

Climate
According to the Köppen Climate Classification system, Brockway has a semi-arid climate, abbreviated "BSk" on climate maps.

References

External links
Official Brockway, Montana website

Unincorporated communities in McCone County, Montana
Unincorporated communities in Montana
Census-designated places in McCone County, Montana
Census-designated places in Montana